Rhizolecia is a genus of lichenized fungi within the Lecideaceae family. This is a monotypic genus, containing the single species Rhizolecia hybrida.

References

External links
Rhizolecia at Index Fungorum

Lichen genera
Lecideales genera